Henri Kontinen and Frederik Nielsen were the defending champions but decided not to participate.
Jamie Delgado and Jonathan Marray won the title, defeating Sam Barry and Daniel Glancy 6–2, 6–2 in the final.

Seeds

Draw

Draw

References
 Main Draw

Aegon Pro-Series Loughborough - Doubles
2011 Men's Doubles